Bolt or bolts may refer to:

Implements and technology
Etymology: "to strike", see for example Thunderbolt
 Bolt (fastener), a threaded shaft, used to clamp two components together
 Bolt (climbing), an anchor point used in rock climbing
 Bolt (firearms), a mechanism used in firearms
 Crossbow bolt, ammunition used in a crossbow

Arts, entertainment, and media
 Bolt (1994 film), a drama starring Richard Grieco
 Bolt (2008 film), a Disney animated film
 Bolt (Disney character), the main character of the film
 Bolt (video game), based on the film
 Bolt (DC Comics), a fictional supervillain from DC Comics
 Bolt (1986), a book by Dick Francis
 B.O.L.T, a Japanese girl group
 The Bolt (Fragonard), a painting by Jean-Honoré Fragonard
 The Bolt (Shostakovich), a three-act ballet by Dmitri Shostakovich
 The Bolts, an American independent rock band

Businesses and organizations
 Bolt (company), an Estonian transportation network company
 Bolt (social network), a British Social Network co-founded by Christel Quek
 Bolt Creative, an American video game developer
 Bolt Mobility, an American electric scooter company co-founded by Usain Bolt
 Bolt Financial, an American fintech company founded by Ryan Breslow

Computing
 Bolt (network protocol), a network protocol used in database applications
 Bolt (web browser), a web browser for mobile phones
 Bolt (website), a social networking and video website active from 1996 to 2007

Places
 Bolt, West Virginia, United States, an unincorporated census-designated place
 Bolt, Wisconsin, United States, an unincorporated community
 Bolt Head, a National Trust headland in Devon, England, United Kingdom
 La Bolt, South Dakota, United States, a town
 Mount Bolt, Victoria Land, Antarctica

Sports
 Bolt Arena, a football stadium in Helsinki, Finland
 Anaheim Bolts, a Professional Arena Soccer League team
 Boston Bolts (1988–1990), a short-lived American Soccer League team
 Boston Bolts (USL), a semi-professional soccer team
 Los Angeles Chargers (secondary nickname), a National Football League team
 Meralco Bolts, a Philippine Basketball Association team
 Tampa Bay Lightning (secondary nickname), a National Hockey League team

Vehicles
 Chevrolet Bolt EV, a 2016–present American subcompact electric hatchback
 Chevrolet Bolt EUV, a 2021–present American subcompact electric SUV
 Tata Bolt, a 2014–2019 Indian subcompact hatchback
 Yamaha Bolt, a 2013–present American-Japanese cruiser motorcycle

Other uses
 Bolt (cloth), a unit of measurement
 Bolt (surname)

See also
 Bolting (disambiguation)
 Lightning bolt (disambiguation)
 Screw, a type of fastener, in some ways similar to a bolt